John Wood was one of the two MPs for Ipswich in the English parliaments of 1420.

References

Wood